Durham Women Football Club is a women's football club based in Durham, Northern England. The team has competed in the FA Women's Championship, the second tier of Women's football in England, since 2014 having been awarded a licence in its inaugural season. They play their home games at Maiden Castle, part of Durham University.

History
Durham W.F.C. was founded in 2014 as a collaboration between South Durham & Cestria Girls and Durham University. Prior to that, Cestria, founded in 2006 as a youth team by Lee Sanders, had become perennial achievers, winning the World Peace Cup in Oslo in 2010 and finishing runners-up at the 2011 Gothia World Youth Cup. In their only season as a senior side before the merger Cestria won the 2012–13 Northern Combination Women's Football League. Sanders, in conjunction with Quentin Sloper, head of sport at Durham University, then created Durham W.F.C in time for the 2014 FA WSL expansion.

Durham's first competitive matches were in the 2013–14 FA Women's Cup where they reached the fifth round. The team's first league game was held on 17 April 2014, a 2–4 defeat against local rivals Sunderland at their New Ferens Park home. The Wildcats secured their first league victory away at London Bees, with a 1–0 win at The Hive Stadium. Despite a difficult start to the 2014 season, the Wildcats finished 6th. They won five, drew three and lost ten of their eighteen games.

2015 saw a much improved season for the Wildcats, including a better points total, albeit achieving a lower league finish, 7th place a reward for an injury-ravaged season.

However 2016, saw Durham really hit their stride, with the Wildcats competing for promotion up until the final weeks of the season. The signings of Sarah Robson, Becky Salicki and Emily Roberts among others proved a catalyst as the Wildcats excelled throughout 2016. A record-breaking season eventually ended in a 4th-place finish with a highest-ever points total. They were also awarded the 'FA WSL 2 Club of the Year' award at the 2017 FA Women's Football Awards.

2017–18 was the Wildcats best ever season, finishing 4th, gaining 35 points in the process and only two points off second place. Durham also enjoyed their best ever FA Women's Cup run, reaching the quarter-finals before losing to Everton.

2018–19 started well for the Wildcats, including a Continental Cup win over FA WSL side Everton and a 0–0 draw away at newly-formed Manchester United. Durham won 3–1 in the Home League fixture, thus becoming the first team to beat the Red Devils. 2018–19 also saw The Wildcats reach their second successive FA Cup quarter-final before narrowly losing 1–0 to Chelsea in front of a record attendance of 1,629.

Durham Hospitals Radio have broadcast all Home matches since 2014 via their website to Durham Hospital (UHND) and around the world.

In October 2020, Durham Women became one of 41 clubs to be founding signatories of the Football Association’s Football Leadership Diversity Code (including two others from the Women's Championship).

Players

Current squad

Club staff

Records
Record attendance: 1,695 vs Manchester, FA Women's League Cup, 26 October 2022

Season summary

References

External links
Official site

Women's football clubs in England
Football clubs in County Durham
Women's Championship (England) teams
2014 establishments in England
Association football clubs established in 2014